James Buckham Kennedy (February 23, 1844 – September 25, 1930) was a Canadian lumberman and Liberal politician. Kennedy was the MLA for New Westminster from  1894 to 1898 and Member of Parliament for New Westminster for one term from 1904 to 1908. He also sat on New Westminster's city council.

Kennedy was married first in New Westminster B.C. on November 30, 1880 to Josephine Eugenia DeBeck who was born in 1859 in New Brunswick, and died in Los Gatos, California in 1883. She was the daughter of George and Eliza Ann DeBeck. They had one son Clarence George Kennedy born May 6, 1882 in New Westminster B.C., who died March 27, 1908 in Vernon, BC. All, except Josephine, are buried in the Fraser Cemetery New Westminster B.C.

References

 

1844 births
1930 deaths
Liberal Party of Canada MPs
Members of the House of Commons of Canada from British Columbia
British Columbia Liberal Party MLAs